Eigenmann is a surname. Notable persons with that surname include:

 Andi Eigenmann (born 1990), Filipino actress
 Carl H. Eigenmann (1863–1927), German–American ichthyologist, husband of Rosa Eigenmann
 Eduardo de Mesa Eigenmann, birth name of Eddie Mesa (born 1940), Filipino actor and singer, father of Michael de Mesa, Mark Gil and Cherie Gil
 Evangeline Rose Gil Eigenmann, birth name of Cherie Gil (1963–2022), Filipino actress, sister of Michael de Mesa and Mark Gil
 Gabby Eigenmann (born 1978), Filipino actor, son of Mark Gil 
 Geoff Eigenmann (born 1985), Filipino actor, son of Michael de Mesa and Gina Alajar, brother of Ryan Eigenmann
 Max Eigenmann (born 1987), Filipino actress
 Michael Edward Gil Eigenmann, birth name of Michael de Mesa (born 1960), Filipino actor, brother of Mark Gil and Cherie Gil
 Raphael John Gil Eigenmann, birth name of Mark Gil (1961–2014), Filipino actor, brother of Michael de Mesa and Cherie Gil
 Rosa Smith Eigenmann (1848–1947), American ichthyologist, wife of Carl Eigenmann
 Ma. Rosa Francisca Catalina Castellvi Gil-Eigenmann, marital name of Rosemarie Gil (born 1942), Filipino actress, wife of Eddie Mesa, and mother of Michael de Mesa, Mark Gil, and Cherie Gil
 Ryan Eigenmann (born 1978), Filipino actor, son of Michael de Mesa and Gina Alajar, brother of Geoff Eigenmann
 Timothy Mark Eigenmann, birth name of Sid Lucero (born 1981), Filipino actor, son of Mark Gil